Queen Anne's Revenge was an early-18th-century ship, most famously used as a flagship by Edward Teach, better known by his nickname Blackbeard. Although the date and place of the ship's construction are uncertain, it was originally believed she was built for merchant service in Bristol, England in 1710 and named Concord, later captured by French privateers and renamed La Concorde. After several years' service by French sailors (both as a naval frigate and as a merchant vessel – much of the time as a slave trading ship), she was captured by Blackbeard in 1717. Blackbeard used the ship for less than a year, but captured numerous prizes using her as his flagship.

In May 1718, Blackbeard ran the ship aground at Topsail Inlet, now known as Beaufort Inlet, North Carolina, United States, in the present-day Carteret County. After the grounding, her crew and supplies were transferred to smaller ships. In 1996, Intersal Inc., a private firm, discovered the remains of a vessel that was later determined to be Queen Anne's Revenge, which was added to the U.S. National Register of Historic Places.The shipwreck was discovered off Beaufort Inlet, North Carolina

History
The ship that would be known as Queen Anne's Revenge was a 200-ton vessel believed to have been built in 1710. She was handed over to René Duguay-Trouin and employed in his service for some time before being converted into a slave ship, then operated by the leading slave trader René Montaudin of Nantes, until sold in 1713 in Peru or Chile. She was briefly re-acquired by the French Navy in November 1716, but was sold by them for commerce five months later in France, again for use as a slaver. She was captured by Blackbeard and his pirates on 28 November 1717, near the island of Saint Vincent in the West Indies.

After selling her cargo of slaves at Martinique, Blackbeard made the vessel into his flagship, adding more heavy cannon and renaming her Queen Anne's Revenge. The name may come from the War of the Spanish Succession, known in the Americas as Queen Anne's War, in which Blackbeard had served in the Royal Navy, or possibly from sympathy for the Jacobite cause (Queen Anne being the last Stuart monarch). Blackbeard sailed this ship from the west coast of Africa to the Caribbean, attacking British, Dutch, and Portuguese merchant ships along the way.

Shortly after blockading Charleston harbor in May 1718, and refusing to accept the Governor's offer of the King's Pardon, Blackbeard ran Queen Anne's Revenge aground while entering Beaufort Inlet, North Carolina on 10 June 1718. A deposition given by David Herriot, the former captain of the sloop Adventure, states "Thatch's [Teach's] ship Queen Anne's Revenge run a-ground off of the Bar of Topsail-Inlet." He also states that Adventure "run a-ground likewise about Gun-shot from the said Thatch" in an attempt to kedge Queen Anne's Revenge off the bar. Blackbeard then disbanded his flotilla and escaped by transferring supplies onto the smaller Adventure. He stranded several crew members on a small island nearby, where they were later rescued by Captain Stede Bonnet. Some suggest Blackbeard deliberately grounded the ship as an excuse to disperse the crew. Shortly afterward, he surrendered and accepted the King's Pardon for himself and his remaining crewmen from Governor Charles Eden at Bath, North Carolina. However, Blackbeard returned to piracy later that year and was killed in combat in November 1718.

Discovery and excavation

Intersal Inc., a private research firm, discovered the wreck believed to be Queen Anne’s Revenge on November 21, 1996. It was located by Intersal's director of operations, Mike Daniel, who used historical research provided by the company's president, Phil Masters and maritime archaeologist David Moore. The shipwreck lies in 28 feet (8.5 m) of water about one mile (1.6 km) offshore of Fort Macon State Park (34°41′44″N 76°41′20″W), Atlantic Beach, North Carolina. On 3 March 1997, the governor of North Carolina, James B. Hunt held a press conference in Raleigh, North Carolina. He stated: "The state of North Carolina is working to protect the site and will do everything we can to that end. We look forward to the day when all North Carolinians can see these exciting artifacts for themselves." Thirty cannons have been identified to date and more than 300,000 artifacts have been recovered. The cannons are of different origins including Sweden and England, and of different sizes as would be expected with a colonial pirate crew. 

For one week in 2000 and 2001, live underwater video of the project was webcast to the Internet as a part of the QAR DiveLive educational program that reached thousands of children around the world. Created and co-produced by Nautilus Productions and Marine Grafics, this project enabled students to talk to scientists and learn about methods and technologies utilized by the underwater archaeology team.

In November 2006 and 2007, more artifacts were discovered at the site and brought to the surface. The additional artifacts appear to support the claim that the wreck is that of Queen Anne's Revenge. Among evidence to support this theory is that the cannons were found loaded. In addition, there were more cannons than would be expected for a ship of this size, and the cannons were of different makes. Depth markings on the part of the stern that was recovered point to it having been made according to the French foot measurements.

By the end of 2007, approximately one third of the wreck was fully excavated. Part of the hull of the ship, including much of the keel and part of the stern post, has survived. The  stern post was recovered in November 2007. The NCDNCR set up the website Queen Anne's Revenge to build on intense public interest in the finds. Artifacts recovered in 2008 include loose ceramic and pewter fragments, lead strainer fragments, a nesting weight, cannon apron, ballast stones, a sword guard and a coin.

Goals during the 2010 field season included staging of one of the ship's largest main deck cannons to the large artifact holding area on site, taking corrosion readings from anchors and cannon undergoing in situ corrosion treatment, attaching aluminum-alloy anodes to the remaining anchors and cannons so as to begin their in situ corrosion treatment and continuing site excavations.

In 2011 the  anchor from the ship was brought to the surface, along with a range of makeshift weaponry including langrage or canister shot.

On August 29, 2011, the National Geographic Society reported that the State of North Carolina had confirmed the shipwreck as Queen Anne's Revenge, reversing a conclusion previously maintained because of a lack of conclusive evidence. Specific artifacts that support this conclusion include a brass coin weight bearing the bust of Queen Anne of England, cast during her reign (1702–1714); the stem of a wine glass decorated with diamonds and tiny embossed crowns, made to commemorate the 1714 coronation of Queen Anne's successor, King George I; the remains of a French hunting sword featuring a bust that closely resembles King Louis XV, who claimed the French throne in 1715; and a urethral syringe for treating venereal diseases with a control mark indicating manufacture between 1707 and 1715 in Paris, France.

On June 21, 2013, the National Geographic Society reported recovery of two cannons from Queen Anne's Revenge. Several months later, on October 28, archaeologists recovered five more cannons from the wreck. 

The 23rd of 30 cannons identified at the wreck site was recovered on October 24, 2014. Nine cannonballs, bar shot halves, an iron bolt and a grenado were also recovered during the 2014 field season.

In January 2018, sixteen fragments of paper were identified after being recovered from sludge inside a cannon. The scraps were from a copy of the book A Voyage to the South Sea, and Round the World, Perform'd in the Years 1708, 1709, 1710 and 1711 by Captain Edward Cooke, in which Cooke travels under Woodes Rogers; it is likely the pages were torn from the book and used as wadding in that cannon. A portion of the objects and artifacts found at the shipwreck have been given on long-term loan to the Smithsonian and are on display in the National Museum of American History. Additionally, some artifacts have been loaned to the Musée National de la Marine in Paris.

In total, 24 of 30 known cannon have been excavated. Of these, six cast-iron cannon bear founder's marks or proof marks indicative of a specific nation of origin. One 1/2-pounder carries an English proof mark, a 4-pounder carries an English proof mark and the founder's mark for Major John Fuller (1652-1722) of the Heathfield Furnace in East Sussex, and four 1-pounders carry founder's markings for Jesper Eliaeson Ehrencreutz at Ehrendals works in Södermanland, Sweden, in 1713. Two of the Ehrendal cannon also carry legible date marks for 1713.

Ownership and legal controversies
Recognizing the significance of Queen Anne's Revenge, the North Carolina Department of Natural and Cultural Resources (NCDNCR), Intersal, and Maritime Research Institute (MRI) entered into a memorandum of agreement in 1998. Intersal agreed to forgo entitlement to any coins and precious metals recovered from the wreck site in order that all artifacts remain as one intact collection, and in order for NCDNCR to determine the ultimate disposition of the artifacts. In return, Intersal was granted media, replica, and other rights related to an entity known as Blackbeard's Queen Anne's Revenge Shipwreck Project; MRI was granted joint artifact touring rights with NCDNCR. NCDNCR, Intersal, and Rick Allen of Nautilus Productions signed a settlement agreement on October 24, 2013, connected to commercial, replica, and promotional opportunities for the benefit of Queen Anne's Revenge. The State of North Carolina owns the wreck since it lies in state waters (within the three-mile limit).

Archaeological recovery ceased on the shipwreck after the 2015 season because of lawsuits filed against the State of North Carolina, the NCDNCR, and the Friends of the Queen Anne's Revenge nonprofit. Intersal, which discovered the Queen Anne's Revenge, filed suit in state court over contract violations. In a unanimous decision on November 2, 2019, the North Carolina Supreme Court affirmed Intersal's complaint and voted to send the lawsuit back to complex business court for reconsideration. In 2015, the state government of North Carolina uploaded videos of the wreck of the Queen Anne's Revenge to its website without permission. As a result, Nautilus Productions, the company documenting the recovery since 1998, filed suit in federal court over copyright violations and the passage of "Blackbeard's Law" by the North Carolina legislature. Before posting the videos the North Carolina Legislature passed "Blackbeard's Law", N.C. Gen Stat §121-25(b), which stated, "All photographs, video recordings, or other documentary materials of a derelict vessel or shipwreck or its contents, relics, artifacts, or historic materials in the custody of any agency of North Carolina government or its subdivisions shall be a public record pursuant to Chapter 132 of the General Statutes." On November 5, 2019, the U.S. Supreme Court heard oral arguments in Allen v. Cooper. On March 23, 2020, the Supreme Court ruled in favor of North Carolina and struck down the Copyright Remedy Clarification Act, which Congress passed in 1989 to attempt to curb such infringements of copyright by states, in Allen v. Cooper.

National Register of Historic Places
Queen Anne's Revenge was added to the National Register of Historic Places in 2004. The reference number is 04000148. It is listed as owned by the State of North Carolina and located near Morehead City. The wreck site is designated 31CR314 by the state of North Carolina.

In popular culture 

 "Queen Anne's Revenge" is the title of a song by American Celtic punk band Flogging Molly, from their 2004 album Within a Mile of Home.
"Queen Anne's Revenge" is a jazz song recorded by The Sean J. Kennedy Quartet featuring drummer Liberty DeVitto.
Queen Anne's Revenge appears in the 2011 film Pirates of the Caribbean: On Stranger Tides, portrayed by Sunset, a ship which previously portrayed the Black Pearl in the film's predecessors: Pirates of the Caribbean: Dead Man's Chest and Pirates of the Caribbean: At World's End. This incarnation of the ship was shown to shoot Greek fire from its prow. Queen Anne's Revenge also appeared in the Pirates of the Caribbean Online video game. The ship returned in the 2017 film Pirates of the Caribbean: Dead Men Tell No Tales where it served as the flagship of Hector Barbossa's pirate fleet.
It appears in the video game Assassin's Creed IV: Black Flag by Ubisoft. The ship is briefly playable during a mission to assist Blackbeard.
It appears in Rick Riordan's 2006 novel The Sea of Monsters, in which Percy Jackson and Annabeth Chase find the ship docked on Circe's island and steal it to sail through the Sea of Monsters, the ship's crew having been captured by Circe long before and transformed into hamsters. As the son of Poseidon, Percy proves to be able to sail the Queen Anne's Revenge through just his willpower alone. It is sunk near the end of the book by Polyphemus who hits it with giant boulders.
The ship appears in the 2018 DC's Legends of Tomorrow episode "The Curse of the Earth Totem".
The ship also appears in the 2004 remake of the video game Sid Meier's Pirates! at first as an NPC ship captained by Blackbeard, but which can be captured and used as a player ship if the player defeats Blackbeard in battle.
 Lego Pirates of the Caribbean also features Queen Anne's Revenge.
 The ship is used by Blackbeard in the third and fourth season of the TV series Black Sails (2014-2018).
 "Месть королевы Анны" (Russian for Queen Anne's Revenge) is the title of a song by Russian Rock band Aquarium, from their album Tor.
  Queen Anne’s Revenge is featured in the mobile game Fate/Grand Order as Blackbeard's Noble Phantasm.

See also
Robert Lane (pirate), whose ship was also named Queen Anne's Revenge

References

External links

N.C Supreme Court revives lawsuit over Blackbeard’s ship and lost Spanish treasure ship, Fayetteville Observer
Queen Anne's Revenge: Archaeological Site, North Carolina Department of Cultural Resources
Blackbeard's Ship Confirmed off North Carolina National Geographic News
Piracy worries in pirate pursuit Blackbeard , Baltimore Sun
Philip Masters, True Amateur of History, Dies at 70, New York Times
Episode 955: Pirate Videos, Planet Money, NPR
National Register of Historic Places, National Park Service
Scientists Show Relics From Ship Fit For Pirate, Possibly Blackbeard, Chicago Tribune
Resurrecting the Notorious Queen Anne's Revenge, ARTpublika Magazine

Age of Sail ships of England
Carteret County, North Carolina
Pirate ships
Archaeological sites on the National Register of Historic Places in North Carolina
Shipwrecks of the Carolina coast
Shipwrecks on the National Register of Historic Places in North Carolina
Maritime incidents in 1718
1710s ships
Maritime folklore
National Register of Historic Places in Carteret County, North Carolina
Underwater archaeological sites
Underwater archaeology
Slave ships
Shipwrecks
Shipwrecks in the Atlantic Ocean
Ships attacked and captured by pirates
Anne, Queen of Great Britain
Captured ships